Pterostylis longipetala, commonly known as the curved greenhood, is a species of orchid endemic to eastern Australia. As with similar greenhoods, the flowering plants differ from those which are not flowering. The non-flowering plants have a rosette of leaves flat on the ground but the flowering plants have a single flower with leaves on the flowering spike. This greenhood has dark green, brown and white flowers which lean slightly forwards and have sharply-pointed petals and a long, curved labellum.

Description
Pterostylis longipetala is a terrestrial, perennial, deciduous, herb with an underground tuber and when not flowering, a rosette of between three and six egg-shaped, dark green leaves lying flat on the ground. The flowers are dark green, brown and white. The dorsal sepal and petals are fused, forming a hood or "galea" over the column. Flowering occurs from April to June.

Taxonomy and naming
Pterostylis longipetala was first formally described in 1943 by Herman Rupp from a specimen collected at Batemans Bay. The description was published in Proceedings of the Linnean Society of New South Wales. The specific epithet (longipetala) is derived from the Latin words longus meaning "long" and petalum meaning "petal". Rupp did not give a reason for this epithet but did note that "the petals are narrower and longer than in any other species of Pterostylis known to me".

Distribution and habitat
The curved greenhood grows on moist slopes in coastal and near coastal forests in New South Wales.

References

longipetala
Endemic orchids of Australia
Orchids of New South Wales
Plants described in 1943
Taxa named by Herman Rupp